Munib (also spelled Moneeb, Muneeb, or Münip) is an Arabic masculine given name. It may refer to:
 Muneeb Butt, Pakistani murdered child
 Muneeb Diwan, Canadian cricketer
 Moneeb Iqbal, Scottish cricketer
 Munib Masri, Palestinian politician
 Münip Özsoy, Ottoman Army officer
 Munib Ušanović, Bosnian secretary general
 Munib Younan, Palestinian Lutheran

See also
 Muneeba

Arabic masculine given names
Turkish masculine given names